State Route 276 (SR 276) is a primary state highway in the U.S. state of Virginia. The state highway runs  from SR 256 at Weyers Cave north to U.S. Route 33 (US 33) near Penn Laird.

Route description

SR 276 begins at an intersection with SR 256 (Weyers Cave Road) in the village of Weyers Cave. The highway heads northeast as two-lane undivided Keezletown Road, which also continues south from SR 256 as SR 750. SR 276 crosses the Augusta–Rockingham county line at the North River and continues as Cross Keys Road. Just north of the village of Cross Keys, the state highway intersects SR 253 (Port Republic Road). SR 276 reaches its northern terminus at US 33 (Spotswood Trail) just west of the village of Penn Laird and south of Keezletown at the southern end of Massanutten Mountain.

Major intersections

References

External links

Virginia Highways Project: VA 276

276
State Route 276
State Route 276